The International Council on Security and Development (ICOS) is an international think tank that focuses on Afghanistan and other conflict zones such as Iraq and Somalia. ICOS is a project of the Network of European Foundations' The Mercator Fund. The organisation was originally named the Senlis Council but later rebranded as the International Council on Security and Development to better reflect the interest and activities of the organisation.

The organisation works primarily on security and development issues and states that its overarching objective is "to promote open debate in order to alleviate current governance, development and economic crises and ensure that future policy-making in these areas is informed, humanitarian and delivers impact."

The organisation currently runs five programmes: Human Security and Youth Inclusion, Education and Employment , Public Safety and Citizenship , Global Food Security  and The Rome Consensus for a Humanitarian Drug Policy.

ICOS programs
Human Security and Youth Inclusion
Their programme on Human Security and Youth Inclusion focuses on contemporary conflict zones, including Afghanistan, Iraq, and Somalia. Their reports have noted the problem of unemployment leading to "Angry Young Men" becoming involved in insurgency actions. Their 2010 field research in Afghanistan showed how Afghans in two crucial southern provinces were almost completely unaware of the 11 September attacks, and the negative views held by Afghan citizens against the foreign forces. Their reports have also drawn some controversy, with NATO spokesmen disputing an ICOS report's findings on the extent of the Taliban presence in Afghanistan. Their findings on the ineffectiveness of Canadian development aid in Kandahar were also disputed by CIDA officials, particularly regarding food aid and hospitals.

Education and Employment
The organisation states that its mandate of initiative on Education and Employment is to "identify ongoing local challenges of a rapidly changing society and provide research, advocacy and innovative policy analysis to encourage pragmatic responses and cost-effective long-term solutions".

Public Safety and Citizenship
The organisation's Public Safety and Citizenship initiative "identifies global challenges for public safety in the 21st century, and provides innovative research, advocacy and policy analysis to promote pragmatic responses". It supports states to solve public safety challenges and pave the way for social and economic development, using a "Policy Labs" tool of participatory decision-making. They conducted a pilot project for the project in Asuncion, Paraguay, with the goal of addressing the problem of crack consumption and trafficking in one neighbourhood. ICOS has also worked in Formiga, a community in the Tijuca neighbourhood of Rio de Janeiro, on improving public safety, in cooperation with the local Pacifying Police Unit.

Global Food Security
Their program on Global Food Security, designed in collaboration with the Sir Ratan Tata Trust and CINI, examines the intersection between food security, development, and state security. Their project currently focuses on India and Brazil, as well as maintaining a central aggregation website for information on food security.

Rome Consensus
Their Rome Consensus programme commits 121 National Societies of Red Cross and Red Crescent from Africa, Asia, the Americas, the Middle East and Europe to promote and implement humanitarian approaches to drug use. The declared aims of the Rome Consensus are to bring drugs and drug use to the forefront of social concerns, focusing drug response formulation and implementation on a public health approach. The program is coordinated from London, UK.

Directors and spokesmen
Norine MacDonald QC is both Founder and President of ICOS. Norine MacDonald also serves as Lead Field Researcher (conducting most of her work in Afghanistan and Somalia).

Emmanuel Reinert is executive director and works generally out of the Rio de Janeiro office. His work has led to international campaigns focusing on counter-narcotics and security issues.

Jorrit Kamminga is the Director of Policy Research for ICOS.

Poppy licensing
One of their major policy recommendations is the licensing of opium in Afghanistan for pharmaceutical purposes. They argue that it is based on the premise that there are two problems that need to be solved:
Afghanistan's reliance on opium;
A lack of opiate-based medicines available for pharmaceutical purposes

They contend that this would be a short-to-medium term solution to address the opium crisis that is currently occurring in Afghanistan, since alternative livelihoods programs in the country will take many years to come to fruition and no crop matches the agronomic properties of opium. Meanwhile, according to the World Health Organization there are vast unmet needs for morphine in developed countries and this is an even greater problem in developing countries, compounded by the growing rates of HIV/AIDS and cancer around the world.

Nobel Prize in Chemistry Laureate John Charles Polanyi and Stéphane Dion, leader of the Liberal Party of Canada, have expressed their support for the poppy for medicines project.

Poppy for Medicine
The organisation, in 2007, launched a "Poppy for Medicine" technical dossier that outlined a project model for licensing poppy cultivation and producing essential medicines within Afghanistan at a local level. They purported that village cultivated poppy would be transformed into poppy-based medicines, such as morphine, in Afghan villages. In their dossier, the organisation laid out an integrated control system that combines the involvement of local structures and state authorities such as the police and the Afghan National Army in order to limit diversion. They argued that by making the medicines locally, value is added to the finished product, the proceeds of which will go towards the economic diversification necessary to break ties with the illegal opium industry and eventually phase out opium production.

Food aid in Afghanistan
The organisation has also carried out some food aid activities in informal internal refugee camps in the provinces of Kandahar and Helmand in southern Afghanistan.

References

External links

Foreign policy and strategy think tanks
Think tanks established in 2002